Give Till It's Gone is the tenth studio album by Ben Harper. The album was released in Italy on May 10, 2011 and worldwide on May 17, 2011 by Virgin Records.
It is Harper's first solo album since Both Sides of the Gun, released in 2006. However, his band, Relentless7, feature prominently on all the tracks, even co-writing some of the tracks with Harper. The album's title is taken from a line in the second track, "I Will Not Be Broken."

The album was preceded by the single "Rock N' Roll Is Free", released as a free download on March 22, 2011. In Italy, the first single from the album was "Don't Give Up on Me Now", released on April 1, 2011.

In the album, Ben Harper collaborates with the ex-Beatle Ringo Starr, who co-wrote and played the drums in the tracks "Spilling Faith" and "Get There from Here". Another song from the album, "Pray That Our Love Sees the Dawn", features American singer-songwriter Jackson Browne.

Track listing

Charts and certifications

Charts

Certifications

References

Ben Harper albums
2011 albums
Virgin Records albums